Thelma Gutsche (7 January 1915 – 5 November 1984) was a South African filmmaker, film historian, writer, and arts patron, referred to as "South Africa's most accomplished early cinema historian" by a later film scholar.

Early life and education
Thelma Gutsche was born at Somerset West, Cape Province, the daughter of Jesse Gutsche and Agnes Patricia Anne Mackintosh Gutsche. Her father was a factory manager. She earned degrees at the University of Cape Town in the Ethics, Logic, and Philosophy program. In 1946 she completed her doctoral studies in social history, with a dissertation titled The History and Social Significance of Motion Pictures in South Africa 1895 - 1940. Her dissertation was later published as a book, about which one scholar said, "As a detailed historical account of cinema up to 1940, there is nothing to rival it."

Career
Before and during her doctoral program Gutsche wrote film reviews for The Forum and the Cape Times newspapers. During World War II and afterward, she wrote and directed documentaries and instructional films for the South African government. From 1947 to 1959 she was head of Educational and Information Service of African Consolidated Films Ltd. She was also joint director of Silver Leaf Books, which published the first book of short stories by Nadine Gordimer during her tenure.

Gutsche was a founding member and life president of the Association of Friends of the Johannesburg Art Gallery, and in 1959 a founding member of the Simon van der Stel Foundation (a historic preservation foundation). She was a member of the Africana Museum Advisory Committee beginning in 1956, and a member of the Consultative Committee of the Bensusan Museum of Photography. She served a term as president of the National Council of Women in South Africa.

Works

Gutsche wrote several books, including

 with Patricia Knox
, a biography of Florence Phillips, winner of the 1966 Central News Agency Literary Award.

, a biography of church architect Sophy Gray)

 
, a biography of Sir Arnold Theiler

Personal life
Gutsche died in 1984, from emphysema, aged 69 years, in Montagu, Western Cape. Her papers are archived at the University of Cape Town.

References

Citations

Sources

Further reading

1915 births
1984 deaths
Film historians
South African writers
University of Cape Town alumni